The following are the national records in track cycling in Colombia maintained by the Federación Colombiana de Ciclismo.

Men

Women

References

External links
 Federación Colombiana de Ciclismo web site

Colombia
Records
Track cycling
track cycling